The Sleep of Reason is a BBC Books original novel written by Martin Day and based on the long-running British science fiction television series Doctor Who. It features the Eighth Doctor, Fitz and Trix.

Plot
The Doctor poses as a psychiatrist to investigate strange goings on at a mental health hospital.

Continuity
The Eighth Doctor ages about 100 years during this novel, because he travels back in time using a Sholem-Luz portal to shape events at the turn of the century, and then has to sleep in a casket in the cathedral to return to the present.
The Doctor is always referred to as 'Smith' in this story, except by Fitz and Trix. This is a reference to the classic series, when The Doctor would sometimes call himself John Smith (a very common British name).

Outside References
The title is a take from the 1799 Francisco Goya aquatint etching "El sueno de la razon produce monstruos" ("The Sleep of Reason Produces Monsters"), part of the artist's Los Caprichos set.

External links
The Cloister Library - The Sleep of Reason

2004 British novels
2004 science fiction novels
Eighth Doctor Adventures
Novels by Martin Day